Digitaria is a genus of plants in the grass family native to tropical and warm temperate regions but can occur in tropical, subtropical, and cooler temperate regions as well. Common names include crabgrass, finger-grass, and fonio. They are slender monocotyledonous annual and perennial lawn, pasture, and forage plants; some are often considered lawn pests. Digitus is the Latin word for "finger", and they are distinguished by the long, finger-like inflorescences they produce.

Uses
The seeds are edible, most notably those of fonio (Digitaria exilis and Digitaria iburua), Digitaria sanguinalis, as well as Digitaria compacta. They can be toasted, ground into a flour, made into porridge or fermented to make beer. Fonio has been widely used as a staple crop in parts of Africa. It also has decent nutrient qualities as a forage for cattle.

Lawns
 
The prevalent species of Digitaria in North America are large crabgrass (D. sanguinalis), sometimes known as hairy crabgrass; and smooth crabgrass (D. ischaemum). These species often become problem weeds in lawns and gardens, growing especially well in thin lawns that are watered lightly, under-fertilized, and poorly drained. They are annual plants, and one plant is capable of producing 150,000 seeds per season. In the autumn when the plants die, they leave large voids in the lawn. The voids then become prime areas for the crabgrass seeds to germinate the following season.

Biological control is preferable over herbicide use on lawns, as crabgrass emergence is not the cause of poor lawn health but a symptom, and it will return annually if the lawn is not restored with fertilization and proper watering. Crabgrass is quickly outcompeted by healthy lawn grass because, as an annual plant, crabgrass dies off in autumn and needs open conditions for its germination the following spring.

Selected species

Digitaria ammophila (Benth.) Hughes – silky umbrella grass
Digitaria bicornis (Lam.) Roemer & J.A.Schultes ex Loud. – Asian crabgrass
Digitaria brownii (Roem. & Schult.) Hughes – cotton panic grass
Digitaria californica (Benth.) Henrard – Arizona cottontop
Digitaria ciliaris (Retz.) Koeler – summer grass, southern crabgrass
Digitaria cognata (Schult.) Pilg.  – fall witchgrass, Carolina crabgrass, mountain hairgrass
Digitaria compacta (Roth ex Roem. & Schult.) Veldkamp
Digitaria cruciata (Nees) A. Camus
Digitaria ctenantha (F.Muell.) Hughes – comb finger grass
Digitaria didactyla Willd.  – Queensland blue couch
Digitaria divaricatissima var. macractinia (Benth.) Heather L.Stewart & N.G.Walsh
Digitaria eriantha Steud. – pangolagrass, Smuts finger grass, woolly finger grass
Digitaria exilis  (Kippist) Stapf – white fonio
Digitaria filiformis (L.) Koeler – slender crabgrass
Digitaria gracillima (Scribn.) Fernald – longleaf crabgrass
Digitaria horizontalis Willd. – Jamaican crabgrass
Digitaria iburua Stapf – Black fonio
Digitaria insularis (L.) Fedde – sourgrass
Digitaria ischaemum (Schreb.) Schreb. ex Muhl. – smooth crabgrass, small crabgrass, smooth finger grass
Digitaria longiflora (Retz.) Pers. – Indian crabgrass
Digitaria milanjiana  (Rendle) Stapf – Madagascar crabgrass
Digitaria nuda Schumacher – naked crabgrass
Digitaria pauciflora Hitchc. – twospike crabgrass
Digitaria platycarpha (Trin.) Stapf
Digitaria petelotii Henrard
Digitaria radicosa (C.Presl) Miq. – trailing crabgrass
Digitaria sanguinalis (L.) Scop. – hairy crabgrass, large crabgrass
Digitaria seriata  Stapf – Sandveld fingergrass
Digitaria setigera Roth ex Roemer & J.A.Schultes – East Indian crabgrass
Digitaria serotina (Walt.) Michx. – dwarf crabgrass
Digitaria stenotaphrodes (Nees ex Steud.) Stapf
Digitaria texana A.S.Hitchc. – Texas crabgrass
Digitaria velutina (Forssk.) P.Beauv – velvet crabgrass
Digitaria villosa (Walt.) Pers. – shaggy crabgrass
Digitaria violascens Link – violet crabgrass

References

External links
 
 

Digitaria
Poaceae genera
Cereals